Holcodiscidae is an ammonite family placed in the superfamily Desmoceratoidea.

Description
Moderately involute with rounded, rectangular, or depressed whorl section; straight or sinuous, fine, dense ribs typically continuing over venter and may be periodically truncated by oblique, enlarged ribs, with or without umbilical, lateral and ventrolateral tubercles. Suture rather simple.

Genera
 Astieridiscus
 Holcodiscus
 Jeanthieuloyites
 Parasaynoceras
 Spitidiscus

Distribution
Fossils of species within this family have been found in the Cretaceous sediments in Argentina, Austria, Bulgaria, Chile, Colombia, the Czech Republic, Czechoslovakia, France, Hungary, Italy, Mexico, Morocco, Portugal, Romania, Slovakia, Spain and Russia.

References

External links
 

 Arkell, W. J. et al., (1957). Mesozoic Ammonoidea  in  Treatise on Invertebrate Paleontology, Part L, Ammonoidea. Geological Society of America and Univ Kansas Press.

Cretaceous ammonites
Early Cretaceous first appearances
Santonian extinctions
Ammonitida families
Desmoceratoidea